Kristine Sutherland (born Kristine Young; April 17, 1955) is an American actress best known for her starring role as Buffy Summers' mother Joyce Summers on the television series Buffy the Vampire Slayer, where she appeared in every season, and her role as Mae Thompson in Honey, I Shrunk the Kids (1989).

Early life
She was born Kristine Young in Boise, Idaho, and changed her name because she was often confused with another similarly named actress. The last name "Sutherland" was after her cat, whom she named "Donald" after Donald Sutherland, who, coincidentally, had a role in the original Buffy the Vampire Slayer film, Joss Whedon's first attempt to bring Buffy to audiences. She is not related to Donald Sutherland, his sons Kiefer, Rossif and Angus, or his granddaughter Sarah Sutherland.

She attended high school in Lexington, Kentucky, where she participated in the Tates Creek Drama program. After graduating, she enrolled in the University of Kentucky.

Career
Sutherland's first film role was as a secretary in Legal Eagles (1986). She appeared as Mae Thompson in the 1989 film Honey, I Shrunk the Kids. Her career received a big boost when she played Buffy's mother in the action-horror television series Buffy the Vampire Slayer, from 1997 to 2002. Creator Joss Whedon later stated that one of the reasons he chose Sutherland for the role was the fact that she exuded a warm demeanor, as well as what he believed to be a close resemblance to actress Sarah Michelle Gellar, who was to portray her daughter in the series. She appeared regularly on the show for the first five seasons before leaving, but returned for three more guest appearances, one in season 6 and two in season 7.

After leaving Buffy, Sutherland attended a photography course at the Santa Monica College and subsequently set up a studio specializing in portraits. In 2008, she appeared in the television miniseries Comanche Moon and had a guest role in an episode of New Amsterdam.

She voiced Haru's Mother in the English dub of The Cat Returns.

Personal life
Sutherland is married to actor John Pankow. They have one daughter.

Filmography

Film

Television

Video games

References

External links

1955 births
Living people
Actresses from Idaho
20th-century American actresses
21st-century American actresses
American film actresses
American soap opera actresses
American television actresses
American voice actresses